Mohamed Talbi, (16 September 1921 – 1 May 2017) was a Tunisian, author, professor, and Islamologist.

Biography
Talbi was born in Tunis on 16 September 1921, attending school there and going on to study in Paris. Talbi wrote prolifically on a wide range of topics, including the history of the medieval  Maghreb, Islam and its relationship with both women and democracy, and Islam's role in the modern world.

Talbi died in Tunis on 1 May, 2017.

Career
Talbi spent most of his educational career teaching Mediterranean and North African history. He taught the Institute of Higher Education of Tunis. In 1955, he became the first dean of the School of Letter and Human Sciences of Tunis, as well as chairing the school's history department. He later directed the scientific journal .

In 1968, Talbi defended his Ph.D. thesis, The Aghlabid Emirate, a political History, at the Sorbonne. It was focused on Tunisia's first Muslim dynasty, addressing especially the history and key role of slavery in the Emirate’s agriculture and economy.

Talbi was appointed president of the Tunisian Academy of Sciences, Letters, and Arts between 2011 and 2012.

Views
On the subject of Islam and democracy, Talbi rejected any direct association between Shura and democracy. He argued that shura originated before Western and Islamic concepts of democracy had even developed, and that the two were not analogous . Talbi also argued that democracy as rule by the people and notions of human rights, religious pluralism, and equality under the law, embodies values which Talbi believed constituted authentic Islam.

Talbi participated in a number of interfaith dialogues with North African and European Christians, but also criticized the practice often. In a 1987 article, Talbi criticized the (at the time) current poverty of Muslim initiatives or even responses to Euro-Arab or Muslim-Christian dialogue. Talbi also explicitly declared Islam to be open to dialogue with other faiths and cultures. Talbi viewed Muslim-Christian dialogue as a significant religious matter.

Awards

Administrative positions 

 Member of the Real Academia de la Historia (1970)
 Member of the editorial team of the Encyclopaedia of Islam (1978)
 Member of the Universal Academy of Cultures (1994)
 President of the Tunisian Academy of Sciences, Letters, and Arts (2011-2012)

Other acknowledgements 
 Premio letterario internazionale del Mediterraneo in Italy (1979)
 The Léopold Lucas Prize in Germany (1985)
 The Cultural National Prize in Tunisia (1987)
 The Literature National Prize in Tunisia (1991)
 Hiroshima Prize for Peace and Cultural in Sweden (1994)
 The Senator Giovanni Agnelli International Prize in Italy (1997)
 Ibn Khaldun Award in Humanities (2017).

Bibliography

In French
 Al-Mukhassass d'Ibn Sïda : études et index, ed. Imprimerie officielle, Tunis, 1956
 Histoire générale de la Tunisie (collective book), tome II « Le Moyen Âge », ed. Société tunisienne de diffusion, Tunis, 1965
 L'émirat aghlabide (186-296/800-909) : histoire politique, ed. Adrien Maisonneuve, Paris, 1966
 Biographies aghlabides extraites des Madarik du Cadi Iyād (critical edition), ed. Imprimerie officielle de la République tunisienne, Tunis, 1968
 Ibn Khaldûn et l'Histoire, ed. Société tunisienne de diffusion, Tunis, 1965, republishing. Maison tunisienne de l'édition, Tunis, 1973, republishing. Cartaginoiseries, Carthage, 2006
 Islam en dialogue, ed. Maison tunisienne d'édition, Tunis, 1970
 Islam et dialogue, réflexion sur un thème d'actualité, ed. Maison tunisienne d'édition, Tunis, 1972
 Étude d’histoire ifrîqiyenne et de civilisation musulmane médiévale, ed. Université de Tunis, Tunis, 1982
 Réflexions sur le Coran (with Maurice Bucaille), ed. Seghers, Paris, 1989
 Études sur la tolérance (collective book), ed. Beït El Hikma, Carthage, 1995
 Un respect têtu (with Olivier Clément), ed. Nouvelle Cité, Paris, 1995
 Plaidoyer pour un islam moderne, ed. Desclée de Brouwer, Paris, 1998
 Penseur libre en islam. Un intellectuel musulman dans la Tunisie de Ben Ali (with Gwendoline Jarczyk), ed. Albin Michel, Paris, 2002
 Universalité du Coran, ed. Actes Sud, Arles, 2002
 Oriente-Occidente : cartografías de una distancia [Direction], ed. Fondation Marcelino Botín, Santander, 2004
 Réflexion d'un musulman contemporain, ed. Fennec, Casablanca, 2005
 Afin que mon cœur se rassure, ed. Nirvana, Tunis, 2010
 Gaza, barbarie biblique ou de l'extermination sacrée et humanisme coranique, ed. Mohamed Talbi, Tunis, 2010
 L'Islam n'est pas voile, il est culte : rénovation de la pensée musulmane, ed. Cartaginoiseries, Carthage, 2010
 Goulag et démocratie, ed. Mohamed Talbi, Tunis, 2011
 À Benoît XVI, ed. Mohamed Talbi, Tunis, 2011
 Ma religion c'est la liberté : l'islam et les défis de la contemporanéité, ed. Nirvana, Tunis, 2011
 Histoire du Christ. Histoire d’une fraude textes à l’appui, s. ed., Tunis, 2011
 Méditations sur le Coran : Vérité, rationalité, I'jaz scientifique, ed. Mohamed Talbi, Tunis, 2016
 Dieu est amour : guide du musulman coranique, ed. Nirvana, Tunis, 2017

In Italian
 Rispetto nel dialogo. Islamismo e cristianesimo (with Olivier Clément), éd. San Paolo, Roma, 1994
 Un'urgenza dei tempi modern : il dialogo fra gli universi culturali (with Giovanni Agnelli & Marcello Pacini), ed. Fondation Giovanni Agnelli, Turino, 1997
 Le vie del dialogo nell'Islam, ed. Fondation Giovanni Agnelli, Turino, 1999
 Islam e libero pensiero. Laicità e democrazia nel mondo musulmano, ed. UTET Università, Milano, 2005
 Università del Corano, ed. Jaca Book, Milano, 2007

In Dutch
 Dialog mit Afrika und dem Islam (with Léopold Sédar Senghor), ed. Mohr Siebeck, Tübingen, 1987

In Arabic
 Al-Turtûshî, al Hawâdith wa-l-Bida, ed. Imprimerie officielle, Tunis, 1959
 Tarājim Aghlabīyah : mustakhrajah min Madārik al-Qādī ʻIyāḍ, ed. Imprimerie officielle, Tunis, 1968
 Manhajiyyat lbn Khaldûn al-Tâ'rîkhiyya, ed. Dâr al-Hadathâ, Beyrouth, 1981
 Dirāsāt fī tārīkh Ifrīqīyah wa-fī al-ḥaḍārah al-Islāmiyah fī al-ʻaṣr al-wasīṭ, ed. University of Tunis, Tunis, 1982
 Al-dawlaẗu al-aġhlabiyyaẗ (184-296/800-909) : Al-tārīkẖ al-siyāsī, ed. Dār al-Gharb al-Islāmī, Beyrouth, 1985
 Nahnou wa al-ġharb, ed. Abdelkarim Ben Abdallah, Tunis, 1992 (Collective Work)
 Iyal Allah : Afkar Jadidah fi 'Alaqat al-Muslim bi-nafsihi wa bi al-Akharin, ed. Cérès, Tunis, 1992
 Fi Tārīkh Ifrīqīyah, ed. Beït El Hikma, Carthage, 1994
 Ummat al-Wasat, ed. Cérès, Tunis, 1996
 Al-Islâm : Hurriyatun wa Hiwâr, ed. Dâr al-Nahâr, Beyrouth, 1999
 Li yatma'inna qālbî : Quādhiyatû el-îmān, ed. Cérès, Tunis, 2007
 Quādhiyatû al-Hâquîqua, ed. Mohamed Talbi, Tunis, 2015
 Dalil al-muslim al-Cor'ānî, ed. Mohamed Talbi, Tunis, 2016
 Al-Ṣiraa' al-lāhoutî fi Al-Qayrawân ayam al-aġhaliba, ed. Sotumedias, Tunis, 2017

References

1921 births
2017 deaths
Historians of Islam
20th-century Tunisian historians
21st-century Tunisian historians
Tunisian Quranist Muslims
Historians of the Mediterranean
Writers from Tunis
Chevaliers of the Légion d'honneur
Members of the Tunisian Academy of Sciences, Letters, and Arts